The 1991–92 Major Soccer League season was the 14th and final season in league history and would end with the San Diego Sockers winning their tenth NASL or MISL title in 11 indoor seasons, and fifth MISL title in a row.

Recap
After a relatively tranquil 1990-91 season, the league's unstable finances reared their head again at season's end. Attempts to find other financiers for the Kansas City Comets failed and the club folded. Both San Diego and the Dallas Sidekicks were saved by civic outpouring and new ownership groups. A reborn version of the Pittsburgh Spirit was announced on April 29, and the owners of the NHL's Buffalo Sabres expressed interest in putting a team in Buffalo. When faced with the instability of the league, however, both sets of potential owners decided to not put up the $350,000 line of credit needed to play in 1991–92.

Despite the upheaval, the seven teams left soldiered on. The regular season was wide open as playoff positioning went right down to the final game on the schedule. The Cleveland Crunch's George Fernandez scored in overtime to put Cleveland into the playoffs and knock the Wichita Wings out. Wichita had been in first place at the beginning of February, but a 6–13 finish doomed their chances at the postseason. Still, the playoffs themselves went according to form as San Diego defeated Baltimore and Dallas for their fifth straight MSL/MISL title.

There were early signs that the league would survive for another year. Attendance was up over 1990–91, and there were reports in April that the league planned on a 1992-93 season with all seven teams returning and an expanded schedule of 44 games. 

However, the Tacoma Stars announced they were folding on June 5. The hoped-for expansion into Buffalo never came to pass as the Buffalo Blizzard chose to join the smaller and more financially stable National Professional Soccer League on June 18. Attempts to find new owners for the St. Louis Storm failed, leaving the MSL with five teams. Commissioner Earl Foreman announced the dissolution of the league on July 10.

The remaining teams scattered; San Diego and Dallas joined the Continental Indoor Soccer League, while Cleveland and Wichita joined the NPSL. Baltimore Blast owner Ed Hale decided not to join either league, folding the team instead. A new ownership group was awarded an NPSL expansion franchise for Baltimore called the Spirit and signed Blast coach Kenny Cooper to lead the team.

Teams

Regular Season Schedule

The 1991–92 regular season schedule ran from October 19, 1991, to April 4, 1992. At 40 games, it was the shortest schedule for the league since the 1980–81 season and the seven-team lineup was its smallest since the inaugural season of 1978–79.

Final standings
Playoff teams in bold.

Playoffs

Semifinals

Championship Series

Team Attendance Totals

Scoring leaders

GP = Games Played, G = Goals, A = Assists, Pts = Points

All-MISL Teams

League awards
Most Valuable Player: Victor Nogueira, San Diego

Scoring Champion: Zoran Karic, Cleveland

Pass Master: Zoran Karic, Cleveland

Defender of the Year: Kevin Crow, San Diego

Rookie of the Year: Tommy Tanner, Cleveland

Goalkeeper of the Year: Victor Nogueira, San Diego

Coach of the Year Gordon Jago, Dallas

Championship Series Most Valuable Player: Thompson Usiyan, San Diego

Championship Series Unsung Hero: Kevin Crow, San Diego

References

External links
 The Year in American Soccer - 1992
 1992 page - Dallas Sidekicks Memorial Archive
 1991-92 summary at The MISL: A Look Back

Major Indoor Soccer League (1978–1992) seasons
Major
Major